Janet Mitchell is a Barbadian former cricketer who played as a wicket-keeper and right-handed batter. She appeared in one Test match for the West Indies in 1976. She played domestic cricket for  Barbados.

References

External links
 
 

Living people
Date of birth missing (living people)
Year of birth missing (living people)
West Indian women cricketers
West Indies women One Day International cricketers
Barbadian women cricketers